Ajla Tomljanović was the defending champion, having won the event in 2013, but chose not to participate.

Grace Min won the tournament, defeating Victoria Duval in the final, 6–3, 6–1.

Seeds

Main draw

Finals

Top half

Bottom half

References 
 Main draw

Dothan Pro Tennis Classic - Singles
Hardee's Pro Classic